Now That's What I Call Music! 46 may refer to two different "Now That's What I Call Music!" series albums, including:
 Now That's What I Call Music! 46 (UK series)
 Now That's What I Call Music! 46 (U.S. series)